The 1971 North Carolina Tar Heels football team represented the North Carolina Tar Heels of University of North Carolina at Chapel Hill during the 1971 NCAA University Division football season. The Tar Heels were led by fifth-year head coach Bill Dooley and played their home games at Kenan Memorial Stadium. North Carolina won the Atlantic Coast Conference with a perfect conference record of 6–0. They were invited to the 1971 Gator Bowl, where they lost to Georgia.

Schedule

References

North Carolina
North Carolina Tar Heels football seasons
Atlantic Coast Conference football champion seasons
North Carolina Tar Heels football